Ochlockonee may refer to several things all having to do with a river in the United States:

The Ochlockonee River in Florida
Ochlockonee River State Park
Ochlockonee, Florida, an unincorporated area along the river
USS Ochlockonee (AOG-33), a U.S. Navy gasoline tanker